Talus MB-H is a continuous track launch tractor which was specifically designed for the Royal National Lifeboat Institution (RNLI), to launch and recover lifeboats from beach-launched lifeboat stations. The tractor was built by Clayton Engineering Limited in Knighton, Powys.

The tractor is now largely being discontinued because the RNLI have now replaced the Mersey class all-weather lifeboat with the new Shannon Class Lifeboat which uses the new Launch and Recovery System from Supacat.

RNLI Talus MB-H fleet

See also 
 Talus MB-4H launch tractor
 Talus MB-764 Launch tractor
 TC45 launch tractor
 Talus Atlantic 85 DO-DO launch carriage

References 

Royal National Lifeboat Institution launch vehicles
Sea-going tractors
Tractors
Rescue equipment